Djebel-Trozza is a mountain in the Forest of Aala, due east of Al Qayrawan, Tunisia.
Djebel Trozza is located at 35° 33' 51"N and 9° 35' 35" E and there is an abandoned Lead/Zinc mine on the mountain, and Roman Empire ruins are identified as the remains of Tarasa in Byzacena.

References

Catholic titular sees in Africa
Former Roman Catholic dioceses in Africa
Roman towns and cities in Tunisia